Aimson is an English surname. Notable people with the surname include:

 Paul Aimson (1943–2008), English footballer
 Will Aimson (born 1995), English footballer

English-language surnames